Luigi Ricci (1893–1981) was an Italian assistant conductor, accompanist, vocal coach, and author.

Career

Ricci began studying music as a child and at age twelve started accompanying voice lessons given by the famous baritone Antonio Cotogni, who had performed several of Giuseppe Verdi's operas under the composer's supervision. At this early age, Ricci began taking meticulous notes on traditions, which Cotogni was passing on to him from work with 19th-century composers and conductors.

Ricci became an assistant conductor with the Rome Opera House and in that capacity worked eight years with Giacomo Puccini and thirty-four
years with Pietro Mascagni. Other composers with whom he was associated include Ottorino Respighi, Umberto Giordano, Riccardo Zandonai, and Ildebrando Pizzetti. Among the many great conductors with whom he worked were Gino Marinuzzi, Vittorio Gui, Ettore Panizza, Tullio Serafin, Victor de Sabata; as well as singers such as Ezio Pinza, Beniamino Gigli, Toti dal Monte, Giacomo Lauri-Volpi, Maria Caniglia, Tito Gobbi to name but a few. The latter, for instance, in his writings speaks very warmly about Ricci as an understanding and profoundly thinking professional.

Ricci was the author of a collection of four volumes on "Variations, Cadenzas, and Traditions", and of two books "Puccini interprete da se stesso", and "34 anni con Pietro Mascagni". He collaborated on the musical direction of forty-two films and on numerous opera recordings with RCA.

Ricci was also active as a vocal coach at the Accademia Nazionale di Santa Cecilia, where he taught (amongst many others) Sesto Bruscantini, Richard Miller, Anna Moffo, Rosalind Elias, Ezio Flagello, Joanna Bruno, Peter Lindroos, and Martti Wallén.

Selected works
Compositions
Variazioni-Cadenze Tradizioni per Canto. Vol. I: Voci Femminili (Ricordi)
Variazioni-Cadenze Tradizioni per Canto. Vol. II: Voci Maschili (Ricordi)
Variazioni-Cadenze Tradizioni per Canto. Appendice N.1: Voci Miste (Ricordi)
Variazioni-Cadenze Tradizioni per Canto. Appendice N.2: Variazioni e Cadenze di G. Rossini (Ricordi)
Books and articles
Maestri, gole e... gola. Roma, G. Ricordi, 1947. [Memoirs]
Puccini interprete di se stesso, Ricordi Milan, (1954) 2003. 
34 anni con Pietro Mascagni, Edizioni Curci, 1976.
"Fleta e le note filate presente Puccini", Rassegna musicale, Vol. 30, no. 2, April 1977

Recording
Giuseppe Verdi: Il trovatore (Stella Roman (Soprano); Silvia Sawyer (Mezzo Soprano); Anna Marcangeli (Soprano); Gino Sarri (Tenor); Antonio Manca Serra (Baritone); Vittorio Tatozzi (Baritone); Nino Mazziotti (Baritone); Rome Opera House Chorus and Orchestra; Conductor: Luigi Ricci) CD Label: Preiser Records

Further reading
Luigi Ricci collection of scores, 1865-1969 at Isham Memorial Library, Harvard University

External links
Harvard Finding Aid

References
 Luigi Ricci Biography – The Bel Canto Institute

1893 births
1981 deaths
Vocal coaches
Academic staff of the Accademia Nazionale di Santa Cecilia
Accompanists
20th-century pianists
20th-century Italian musicians